Sevastopol Marine Trade Port (SMTP) is a port in Sevastopol. It is located mainly at the Bay of Sevastopol, and at smaller bays around the Heracles peninsula. The port infrastructure is fully integrated with the city of Sevastopol and naval bases of the Russian Navy and the Black Sea Fleet.

Mostly the port belonged to the national government of Ukraine, while portions of it are controlled by the private sector.. The port came under full Russian control when the Crimean peninsula, then under Russian military occupation, joined Russia after a highly criticized referendum on March 16, 2014, known as the 2014 Crimean status referendum, which was soon followed by the annexation of Crimea by the Russian Federation.

History 
A settlement was formed at the Sevastopol port in June 1783 as a base for a naval squadron under the name Akhtiar (White Cliff), by Rear Admiral Thomas MacKenzie (Foma Fomich Makenzi), a native Scot in Russian service; soon after Russia annexed the Crimean Khanate. Five years earlier, Alexander Suvorov ordered that earthworks be erected along the harbor and Russian troops be placed there. In February 1784, Catherine the Great ordered Grigory Potemkin to build a fortress there and call it Sevastopol. The realization of the initial building plans fell to Captain Fyodor Ushakov who in 1788 was named commander of the port and of the Black Sea squadron.
It became an important naval base and later a commercial seaport. In 1797, under an edict issued by Emperor Paul I, the military stronghold was again renamed to Akhtiar. Finally, on April 29 (May 10), 1826, the Russian Senate returned the city's name to Sevastopol.

During World War II, the port of Sevastopol withstood intensive bombardment by the Germans in 1941–42, supported by their Italian and Romanian allies during the Battle of Sevastopol.

The port was leased to Russia on a long-term lease after the devolution of the Soviet Union in the early 1990s.

In early March 2014, during the Russian invasion of Ukraine, Russian sailors scuttled several naval vessels to act as blockships at the entrance to Donuzlav Bay and the port of Sevastapol, in an attempt to prevent Ukrainian navy ships berthed in the port from gaining access to the Black Sea. Ships sunk included the hull of the naval cruiser Ochakov and a diving support vessel of BM-416-class (approximately ).

Location and defined borders 

The territory of the port was defined by the declaration of Cabinet of Ukraine on October 25, 2002 "About aquatorium of the Sevastopol Marine Trade Port". The territory defined was limited by lines that outstretch from extreme points of the Sevastopol city administration border at the Black Sea coast perpendicularly to the coastline and allotted water area, except:
 Kamysheva Bay that belongs to responsibility of the Sevastopol Marine Fish Port
 Territory leased by the Russian Federation for the Black Sea Fleet
 Yuzhnaya Bay (Yuzhnaya bukhta; Южная бухта)
 Territory that is a responsibility zone of the Ministry of Defense of Ukraine
 Pishchana Bay
 Striletska Bay
 Bay of Abramov
 Balaklava Bay
 Territory of Balaclava Bay that is under the responsibility of the State Border Service of Ukraine

Divisions

Passenger terminal
Passenger terminal is located at the pier #143. Along with terminal there is a building of customs.

Cargo district
There is a cargo district located at the eastern end of the Bay of Sevastopol near the city of Inkerman (Little Inkerman) and mouth of the Chorna River. It consists of two transloading complexes PK-1 and PK-2. There was an intention to build a ferry terminal at the pier #50.

Transloading complex #1 (PK-1) has capabilities to handle transferring cargo from water transport onto ground transport such as automotive and rail. The complex is specialized in handling cabotage sand, scrap metal (ferrous and non-ferrous metals) in bulk, coal export.

Portinvest loading area (Avlita)
There is another cargo handling piers that belong to private owners. Among them is Portinvest Holding that belongs to the Ukrainian company System Capital Management. Its cargo handling area is served by a stevedore company Avlita.

Balaklava Port
There is a smaller port located in a remote Balaklava Bay.

South Sevastopol
South Sevastopol is a ship maintenance facility. The factory has a freight-handling complex, ship maintenance shop, own design bureau, builds yachts. It also rents out various vessels such as floating cranes, tugboats, others.

Sevastopol Marine Fishing Port

Fleet
Ships and fleets based in the Port of Sevastopol. The list does not include former fleets among which are fleets of Atlantika State Fishing Company and others. Also fleet of the Yalta Marine Trade Port is assigned to the Port of Sevastopol.

Sevastopol Marine Trade Port
 16 passenger motorboats
 Project 1438, type Molodezhny (Uran, Pluton, Ost, Yupiter, Saturn, Zyuid, Orion, Persei, Omega, Vest, Grigory Ovchinikov, Molodezhny, Nord, Merkury)
 Project 227, 245, type Almaz - Magnolia (Taman)
 Project 485M3, type Raduga (Lazurny)
 2 ferries (Roll-on/roll-off)
 Project 727 (Parom-2, Metallist)
 tanker (RKZ-460)
 2 tugboats
 Project 1496, type MB (Mekhanik Repin)
 Project 498, type Gorokhovets (Mayak)
 bilge water collector (PS-379)
 2 oil spill collector
 Project 25505, type NMS (MNMS-33)
 Project 2550/4, type NMS (MNMS-97)
 oil collector (NMS-36)
 pilot (Lotsman)
 special assignment ship (Kristalny)
 floating workshop (PM-870)
 motorboat for travels (BMK-130)

National Academy of Sciences of Ukraine
 special assignment ship (Professor Vodyanytsky)
 fishing boat (Seival)

Strategic value
The Port of Sevastopol is considered a key hold for maritime routes between the Black Sea and the Sea of Marmara, and, therefore, the Mediterranean Sea and the Atlantic Ocean. The port is one of the few warm deepwater ports available to Russia in the Black Sea.  Russia leased the port from Ukraine, until its annexation in 2014. Access to the port is considered one of the main factors that sparked the 2014 Crimean crisis between Ukraine and Russia, and Russia's subsequent military intervention on Crimea.

References

External links

 Ukrmorrichflot State Administration website
  Port anniversary raises tension over navy's future. Russia Today. 2008-06-14
 Invasion of the Port of Sevastopol by jellyfish. Euronews. 2013-01-03
 Avlita Stevedoring company (Portinvest official website)
 History of the Sevastopol city passenger fleet
 Fleet of Sevastopol, All ships that hoist the Ukrainian flag in Sevastopol
 Official website of the Sevastopol Marine Fishing Port

Ports and harbours of Sevastopol
SCM Holdings
Government-owned companies of Ukraine
Sanctioned due to Russo-Ukrainian War